The Moggy Hollow Natural Area is a  nature preserve in Far Hills, Somerset County, New Jersey, United States. As the Wisconsin Glacier advanced, Glacial Lake Passaic formed eventually rising until it found an  outlet at Moggy Hollow, draining to the Raritan River.  It was designated a National Natural Landmark in January 1970.

Geology
The Wisconsin glacier expanded and closed off lower height gaps to the north, forming Lake Passaic. Even as the glacier retreated, Moggy Hollow remained the main outlet due to debris left at Millburn until Little Falls and Paterson emerged from the ice. There were several post glacial lakes which formed above Moggy Hollow, bringing the ledge to its current height.

History
The property is owned and managed by the Raritan Headwaters Association.  Most of the current site was donated to the association on November 4, 1967, by J. Malcolm Belcher, a former mayor of Far Hills, on behalf of the Belcher family. The remainder of the site was acquired from Leonard J. Buck.

Visiting
The ravine is located adjacent to and above the Leonard J. Buck Garden. Visitors can either ask to cross the Buck Garden to reach the lower portion of the ravine, or park above on Liberty Corner Road to access the top of the ledge. Portions of the hollow are steep and dangerous.

References

External links
Raritan Headwaters Association page
Map of Moggy Hollow Stage

Far Hills, New Jersey
Protected areas of Somerset County, New Jersey
National Natural Landmarks in New Jersey
Raritan River
Watchung Mountains